Enfield is an unincorporated community in Silver Creek Township, Wright County, Minnesota, United States.  The community is located along Wright County Road 75 near Clementa Avenue NW.  Nearby places include Hasty, Clearwater, and Monticello.  Interstate 94 is nearby.

References

Unincorporated communities in Minnesota
Unincorporated communities in Wright County, Minnesota